Curtis is the third studio album by American rapper 50 Cent. It was released September 11, 2007, by Shady Records, Aftermath Entertainment, G-Unit Records, Interscope Records, and Universal Music Group. The album features production from Dr. Dre, Eminem, and Timbaland, among others. Music writers have noted that 50 Cent divides between "hard" and "soft" songs on the album. The album went through many changes in the lead up to its release and was heavily anticipated after the success of 50 Cent's two prior albums, Get Rich or Die Tryin' (2003) and The Massacre (2005).

Curtis received generally mixed reviews from music critics upon release. The album debuted at #2 on the US Billboard 200 chart, selling 691,000 copies in its first week. After years of slumping sales, the album's competition with Kanye West's Graduation (2007) and the resulting record-breaking performances both albums displayed was considered to be a "great day for hip hop."

Background
Initially, 50 Cent's 2007 album which was planned to be Before I Self Destruct. However, he decided to push back its release date to 2008, and instead to release Curtis in 2007. The album's title was changed twice. For the first time, it was changed from "Curtis" to "Curtis S.S.K.". The second time, the title of the album was changed back from "Curtis S.S.K." to "Curtis". The "S.S.K.", which stood for "SoundScan Killer", was intended to show the pressure 50 Cent felt to succeed. The "S.S.K." also stands for "SouthSide King" and "Shoot, Stab, Kill". 50 Cent stated that the album was inspired by his life before his commercial debut, Get Rich or Die Tryin'. He also stated that he chose the album's title because he was known as "Curtis" before he became famous. In January 2007, DJ Whoo Kid predicted the album to be a double disc LP, with one CD having a "crazy club-bangin' ridiculous" theme and the other having a "hard-core killer sh--," theme. However, this did not materialize.

Recording
50 Cent wrote parts of the album in his grandmother's old house in South Jamaica, Queens. He flew to Florida to work on the track titled "Ayo Technology" with Justin Timberlake, and the song was finished in Houston, Texas. While Get Rich or Die Tryin' and The Massacre featured mostly G-Unit and G-Unit Records artists respectively, Curtis features artists that 50 Cent has never worked with before, such as Akon, Justin Timberlake, Mary J. Blige, Robin Thicke, Timbaland and Nicole Scherzinger from The Pussycat Dolls. When asked about his choice of working with artists outside of his company, 50 Cent stated, "The album, for me, was finding a space where I am content and comfortable with my career, where I can go off and create with other artists and experiment a little bit". 50 Cent wrote a significant amount of the guests' lyrics. In an interview with XXL, he said,

Music and lyrics
Stylus Magazine's Jayson Greene writes that "the beats on Curtis sound about as dated and cheap as any Koch record", and that "each no-name producer (Veto and Roomio? Jake One?) provides the comfort food they know he'll lap up". Pitchfork Media's Ryan Dombal also comments that 50 Cent "should be able to work with producers who could conjure his hit-making abilities, but instead the MC mostly sticks with tried-and-failed G-Unit stalwarts and Dre-aping up-and-comers that do him few favors". Dave de Sylvia of Sputnikmusic writes of the production on "Ayo Technology", "Timbaland's shred-guitar-goes-keyboard melody is just mesmerising enough to work".

RapReviews editor Arthur Gailes states that "there is no dip in quality lyrically; 50 is often criticized for not being a good lyricist, but he's exceptionally witty in his writtens", and adds that 50 Cent "manages to cover different themes very well", noting his "seduction" on "Follow My Lead". Greene writes that 50 Cent is trying to "revisit the raw fatalism that defined the best tracks on Get Rich or Die Tryin' ", quoting lyrics from "My Gun Go Off" as an example: "You know tomorrow's just a day away / If you can just keep your heart beatin' and your ass awake".

Critical reception

Curtis received mixed reviews from music critics. At Metacritic, which assigns a normalized rating out of 100 to reviews from mainstream critics, the album received an average score of 58, based on 15 reviews. Stylus Magazine observed that "there isn’t an ounce of life in Curtis". Nathan Rabin of The A.V. Club wrote that 50 Cent "has yet to master the art of making a satisfying album rather than delivering a random assortment of demographic-pandering tracks". Allmusic's David Jeffries wrote that Curtis "is entertaining but only impressive in that 50 can run in place and still be on top". The Boston Globe stated that, "artistically, [Kanye] West is always moving, while 50 is at a standstill". Chicago Tribune critic Greg Kot wrote that "at a time when consumers are expressing their dissatisfaction with music-industry product", Curtis provides "exactly what they say they don't want: More of the same". Chase Hoffberger of The Austin Chronicle found 50 Cent "redundant" and said that the album "tires on second-rate beats, juvenile hooks, and rote lyrics about money and guns." Slant Magazine called 50 Cent "one of the worst lyricists alive", criticizing "Amusement Park"'s lyrics and the execution of his metaphors which he "mumbles without a hint of irony or conviction". Robert Christgau, writing for MSN Music, named it "dud of the month" with a "B" grade and wrote that 50 Cent, "a parvenu mastering pop music for money", has "turned into a made man running on vanity".

In a positive review, USA Todays Steve Jones wrote that its themes of "chip-stacking and sexual prowess [...] aren’t new", but stated that 50 Cent "delivers them with unmatched swagger and flair". Rolling Stone writer Rob Sheffield noted that 50 Cent is "out to prove he's everything he used to claim", and similar to The Massacre, he "divides between hard songs ('Man Down', 'Fire', 'I'll Still Kill') and soft songs ('Follow My Lead')". Sheffield also noted that 50 Cent is for the first time "letting guests sing most of the hooks". Kelefa Sanneh of The New York Times commented that "his mush-mouthed delivery is still charming, and so are his endless provocations". Greg Tate of The Village Voice stated, "Curtis is stuffed with tightly wound 21st-century pop songwriting, full of that invisible craft and flow that renders a thing eminently listenable even if it's gratuitously raunchy, politically reprehensible, and sexually retrograde."

Accolades
Time magazine ranked the single "I Get Money" number six on its list of The 10 Best Songs of 2007. Time critic Josh Tyrangiel praised the song as "hypnotic", observing that its appeal is owed to the "Top Billin" sample, and that 50 Cent's bemusement at his own survival and success "makes the song as wry as it is scary". PopMatters editor Josh Timmermann cited "I Get Money" as "the collection's clear MVP, an iron-fisted ode to living large". 

Curtis earned 50 Cent a win for the Best-Selling Hip-Hop Artist category at the 2007 World Music Awards. However, Entertainment Weekly placed the album at third place in their list of Worst Albums of 2007.

Commercial performance

Curtis debuted at number two on the US Billboard 200 chart, selling 691,000 copies in its first week. It had the fourth highest sales week for an album in 2007 (topping Linkin Park's Minutes to Midnight which sold 625,000, then outsold by the Eagles' Long Road Out of Eden, which moved 711,000 units and later Alicia Keys' As I Am bringing in 742,000 copies.) It also had the highest sales week for an album by an East Coast-based artist since Jay-Z's Kingdom Come debuted with 680,000 copies sold several months earlier. However, Curtis brought in the third-lowest first-week sales of 50 Cent's career, with Get Rich or Die Tryin' selling 872,000  and The Massacre moving 1.14 million copies.

The album sold 143,000 copies in its second week of release in the US, 71,000 copies in its third week, 50,000 copies in its fourth week, 38,000 copies in its fifth week on the chart, and 30,000 copies sold in its sixth week, It sold 24,000 copies in its seventh week, 20,000 in its eighth week, 17,000 in its ninth week, 17,000 in its 10th week, 21,000 in its 11th week, 15,000 in its 12th week, 17,000 in its 13th week, 19,000 in its 14th week, and 25,000 in its 15th week. In the US, Curtis ultimately sold 1,225,000 in 2007.

In 2007, Curtis was ranked as the 36th most popular album of the year on the Billboard 200.

Competition with Graduation
In July 2007, Kanye West changed the release date for his third studio album Graduation from September 18, 2007, to the same release date as Curtis, with September 11, 2007. This forced the albums to go head-to-head and compete for higher sales against each other. 50 Cent claimed that if Graduation sold more records than Curtis, he would stop releasing solo albums. However, he later dispelled his comments. When asked again about his threat to retire, 50 Cent stated that, if he were to lose, he will release an album every time a major Def Jam artist releases an album.

Graduations first-week sales of 957,000 and Curtiss first-week sales of 691,000 served as only the second time since 1991, when Nielsen SoundScan began collecting data, that two albums sold more than 600,000 in a week in the United States; in 1991, Guns N' Roses released Use Your Illusion I and Use Your Illusion II, selling 685,000 and 770,000 copies, respectively. The first-week sales totals of Graduation and Curtis outsold the first-week sales totals of Guns N' Roses' two albums. 50 Cent would argue that although West sold more units domestically in the US, his album sold more units worldwide. In September 2008, Billboard released the one-year sales figures for both albums: Curtis finished with sales of 1,336,000, and Graduation finished with sales of 2,116,000.

Track listing

Notes
 signifies a co-producer.
 signifies an additional producer.

Leftover Tracks

"Keep It Moving"
"Raid" (featuring Pusha T & Pharrell Williams)
"You Should Be Dead"

Sample credits
Informations taken from Curtis liner notes:

"Intro" contains dialogue from the motion picture "Shooters". Used courtesy of Lions Gate Films, Inc. & Geops Amsterdam, B.V., by arrangement YONAS with PFG Entertainment, Inc. Dialogue excerpts spoken by Andrew Howard and Matthew Rhys.
"Man Down" contains elements from "Scooby Doo Theme" (Mook/Raleigh). Mook Bros Music (admin by Warner-Tamerlane Publishing Corp) (BMI)/Ben Raleigh Music (admin by Music Sales Corp) (ASCAP). Used By Permission. All Rights Reserved.
"I Get Money" contains elements from "Top Billin" (Robinson) Songs of Universal, Inc./First Priority Music (BMI)/Hot Buttermilk Music, Inc. (admin ICG Alliance) (ASCAP). Used By Permission. All Rights Reserved. Performed by Audio Two. Produced under license from Atlantic Recording Corp, by arrangement with Rhino Entertainment Company, A Warner Music Group company.
"Come & Go" contains replayed elements from "Just Be Good to Me" (Jam/Lewis). EMI-April Music, Inc./Flyte Tyme Tunes, Inc./Avante Guarde Music Publishing, Inc. (admin by Universal Music Corp) (ASCAP). Used By Permission. All Rights Reserved.
"Movin On Up" contains elements from "Give Me Just Another Day" (Ware). Used By Permission. All Rights Reserved. Almo Music Corp. Performed by The Miracles. Used by courtesy of Motown Records, Co, LLP. By arrangement with Universal Music Enterprises. "Do It Baby" (Perren/Yarian). Jobete Music Co, Inc. (ASCAP). Used By Permission. All Rights Reserved. Performed by The Miracles. Used courtesy of Motown Records, Co, LLC. By arrangement with Universal Music Enterprises; "Nuttin But A Drumbeat". Performed by Russell Simmons. Used courtesy of Island/Def Jam Records. By arrangement with Universal Music Enterprises.

Personnel
 Producers – 50 Cent (exec.), Adam Deitch, Apex, Tha Bizness, Dangerous LLC, Danja, Detroit Red, Don Cannon, Dr. Dre, Eminem, Eric Krasno, Havoc, Jake One, DJ Khalil, Timbaland, Ty Fyffe
 Audio Mixing – Steve Baughman (tracks 2–3, 5, 8–9, 12, 15–17), Demario "Demo" Castelleon (7), Dr. Dre (10-11, 14), Eminem (13), Marcella "Ms. Lago" Araica (4), Mike Strange (13)
 Assistant audio mixing engineer – Seamus "Shameless" Tyson (2-3, 7–9, 12, 15–17), Robert "Roomio" Reyes (6, 11, 14), Doug Sadler (4)
 Keyboard – Adam Deitch (track 2), Dawaun Parker (6, 14), Jay "Detroit Red" Powell (3), Jeff Bass (13), Mark Batson (6, 14), Mike Strange (13), Tony Campana (13)
 Guitar / bass – Eric Krasno (track 2)
 Drum Machine - Adam Deitch (track 2), Eric Krasno (2)
 Multiple Instruments - Taj "Mahal" Brown (track 10)
 Recording Engineers – Tony Yayo (tracks 1–4, 8–9, 11–12, 15, 17), Mauricio "Veto" Iragorri (6, 11, 14), Robert "Roomio" Reyes (6, 14), Eric Krasno (2), Jay "Detroit Red" Powell (3), Alonzo Vargas (5), Demacio "Demo" Castelleon (7),  Frankie "Whispers" Zago (10), Mike Strange (13), Tony Campana (13), Phillip "Philly Blunt" Shpiller (16)
 Assistant Recording Engineers -  Jacob Gabriel (track 6), Charles "Red" Garcia (14)
 Additional Music Recorded by - Steve Baughman (track 5), Ted Clayton (5), Gary Hadfield (7), Ian Stewart (7)
 Additional Audio Mixing;– Mauricio "Veto" Iragorri (track 8)

Charts

Weekly charts

Year-end charts

Certifications

See also
 List of number-one albums of 2007 (Australia)

References

External links
 Curtis at Discogs
 

2007 albums
50 Cent albums
Aftermath Entertainment albums
Albums produced by Apex (producer)
Albums produced by Danja (record producer)
Albums produced by Dr. Dre
Albums produced by DJ Khalil
Albums produced by Don Cannon
Albums produced by Eminem
Albums produced by Havoc (musician)
Albums produced by Jake One
Albums produced by Tha Bizness
Albums produced by Timbaland
Interscope Records albums
Interscope Geffen A&M Records albums
Shady Records albums